The Men's 4 x 400 metres relay event at the 2005 European Athletics Indoor Championships was held on March 6.

Results

Note: Poland originally finished second but was disqualified for colliding with the Spanish team before the last change-over.

4 × 400 metres relay at the European Athletics Indoor Championships
400